Solid Gold Chipmunks is a 30th anniversary compilation music album by Alvin and the Chipmunks, released in 1988 on LP and cassette by Chipmunk Records (Ross Bagdasarian)

Track listing

Side one 

 "We're the Chipmunks" (from the album Songs From Our TV Shows originally)
 "Witch Doctor" (originally by Ross Bagdasarian, Sr., based on Songs From Our TV Shows version)
 "Beat It" (from Songs From Our TV Shows originally)
 "Captain Chipmunk" (from Songs From Our TV Shows originally)
 "Girls Just Want to Have Fun" (from Songs From Our TV Shows originally)
 "The Chipmunk Song (Christmas Don't Be Late)" (originally by Ross Bagdasarian, Sr., based on A Chipmunk Christmas version)

Side two 

 "Alvin for President"
 "Let's Go" (originally from Chipmunk Punk, re-recorded for this album)
 "Thank God I'm a Country Boy" (from Urban Chipmunk originally)
 "Leader of the Pack" (from Chipmunk Rock originally)
 "Mammas Don't Let Your Babies Grow Up to Be Chipmunks" (from Urban Chipmunk originally)

1988 compilation albums
Alvin and the Chipmunks albums
Buena Vista Records albums
Albums produced by Ross Bagdasarian